The Ministry of Tourism (MoT), before 2020 as the Saudi Commission for Tourism and National Heritage (SCTH), till 2015 as the Saudi Commission for Tourism and Antiquities (SCTA) and prior to 2008 as the Supreme Commission for Tourism (SCT), is a government ministry in Saudi Arabia that is concerned with the tourism sector of the country. Established in the year 2000 through a royal decree by King Fahd, it was transformed into a ministry in 2020.

Foundation 
SCTH foundation has passed through several stages before reaching to its current structure by becoming the only public administration authorized and responsible for tourism and national heritage in the Kingdom. These stages are as follows:

 On 12/01/1421 AH, (16/04/2000), Saudi Council of Ministers issued Resolution No. (9), approving the establishment of “Supreme Commission for Tourism” (SCT), stressing that tourism is one of the major productive sectors in retaining Saudi tourist within the country and increase investment opportunities, developing national human resources, and expanding and creating new job opportunities for the Saudi nationals.
 Given the importance of Antiquities and Museums, a Royal decree No. (2/A) dated 28/02/1424 AH ( 30/04/2003), was issued to integrate Antiquities and Museums agency into SCT, accordingly, SCTA came into existence as a body responsible for implementing these tasks in addition to its responsibility for tourism.
 The Council of Ministers on 16/03/1429 AH (23/03/2008) issued a fresh Resolution No. (78), according to which, the name of “Supreme Commission for Tourism” (SCT) was changed to the “Saudi Commission for Tourism and Antiquities” (SCTA), emphasizing that the tourism sector in the Kingdom has become a national reality behind which stands the State, and it requires the formation of a national authority to carry out its planning and development due to many touristic features available in the Kingdom, some of which are:

 Huge archaeological treasure, rare historic sites, and historical museums, all linking the Kingdom to many ancient civilizations.
 The unique geographical location of the Kingdom, its expanse and diverse terrains with a variety of climate and stunning landscapes.
 Long seacoasts along the shores of Red Sea and the Persian Gulf.
 Unique customs and traditions of the Saudi society and the authentic generosity and hospitality of the Saudi citizens.
 Modern infrastructure with advanced services and government's strong tendency towards development of tourism sector.
 Confirmed security and political stability in the kingdom, a robust economy and progressive society.

 On Monday, 12/9/1436 AH (29/6/2015), the Cabinet decided to change the name of “Saudi Commission for Tourism and Antiquities” (SCTA) to “Saudi Commission for Tourism and National Heritage” (SCTH).

Objective 
From the outset, the main objective of the establishment of SCTH has been to pay attention to all aspects of the tourism sector in the Kingdom of Saudi Arabia with respect to its organization, development, and promotion. SCTH is also assigned to work for strengthening of the role of tourism and overcoming barriers impeding its growth, given the Kingdom's huge tourism potential. Its efforts include preservation, development and maintenance of antiquities and activation of tourism’s contribution to cultural and economic development.

Saudi seasons 2019 
In February 2019, the Ministry of Tourism launched a demo program called "Saudi seasons 2019", which conducts 11 tourism seasons that cover most of Saudi provinces, the program was produced by a higher committee supervised by crown prince Mohammed Bin Salman Al-Saud, as well as Ministry of Culture, General Entertainment Authority, General Sports Authority, and Saudi Exhibition & Convention Bureau, moreover, this program is considered the first of its kind on a regional level, the program consists of a number of culture, sports, entertainment, and business related events, the main goals of "Saudi seasons 2019" were to level-up the quality of Saudi resident lives,  increasing economic activity in the country, providing working opportunities for Saudis, and supporting tourism in Saudi.

SCTH's integrated program for the development of national tourism 
In an effort to translate government’s reform and economic restructuring to reality, SCTH has carried out the following tasks:

 Adopted a comprehensive scientific methodology in the project of planning and implementation of the national development of tourism in the past twenty years.  The project includes overall strategy for the development of tourism as well as, operational plan and strategies for tourism development in the regions.
 Planned and implemented integrated program for tourism development, which so far has included more than 125 projects and programs. This program is consistent with the overall development plans, ambitions and directions of the State’s administrative and economic development.
 These initiatives represent an integrated program for the implementation of SCTH tasks, as well as the actual practice of measurements needed to meet challenges and overcome the social, institutional, organizational, administrative, financial, and investment obstacles through detailed operational plans performed according to the timeline
 SCTH is looking to take advantage of the program, and the content covered by the initiatives at the State level in order to achieve a qualitative leap in the performance of important institutions of the State and its various organs, and contribute to the overall development of various sectors.

National tourism development project 
Since March 2001, SCTH, simultaneously with its restructuring process, has planned for integrated national economic project, aiming at developing tourism in the Kingdom during the next twenty years. This comes in the light of its vision on the importance of strategic planning for goals and raise economic efficiency and management.

This comprehensive planning project in its third stage has paid off in the preparation of General Strategy of National Tourism Development, the fifth executive plan (intensive care phase), and 13 provincial strategies for tourism development.

Virtual museum 
STCH launched the "Saudi Archaeological Masterpieces through the Ages" exhibition in July 2018 which they displayed 400 rare artifacts of Saudi Arabia's cultural heritage in the United States and in China.

History 
The idea was put forward by former President of France Jacques Chirac at the “Masterpieces of Islamic Art” exhibition at the National Museum of Saudi Arabia, Riyadh during his visit to Saudi Arabia in 2006 and was taken into consideration by King Abdullah bin Abdul Aziz Al-Saud. The exhibition was inaugurated in 2010 during the reign of King Abdullah bin Abdul Aziz Al-Saud at Louvre Museum, Paris, France. After its success in Paris, the exhibition was further carried out by STCH in several other European, American and European countries.

Museums in Saudi Arabia 

 Museum of the Two Holy Mosques, Mecca
 Al-Zaher Palace Museum, Mecca
 Al Madina Museum in Hejaz Railway Museum, Medina
 Al-Masmak Fort Museum, Riyadh
 The National Museum of Saudi Arabia, Riyadh
 Jeddah Al Khozam Museum, Jeddah
 Tayma Museum, Tayma
 Al Ahsa Museum, Al Ahsa
 Al Baha Museum, Al Baha
 Al-Jouf Museum, Al Jouf
 Al Ula Museum, Al Ula
 Shobrah Palace Museum, Taif
 Tabuk Museum, Tabuk
 Museum of the Northern Border, Arar
 Museum of Hail, Hail
 Museum of Najran, Najran
 Namass Museum, Namass
 Museum of Jazan, Jazan
 Al Ghat Museum, Al Ghat
 Museum of Saudi Aramco, Dhahran
 Museum of Currency, Riyadh
 Saqr Al Jazira Aviation Museum, Riyadh
 Archaeological Museum in King Saud University, Riyadh

MAS Center 
MAS is the Arabic acronym for Tourism Information and Research Center, It is an important department of the SCTH responsible for collecting tourism data and conducting researches and related studies. According to the Article 4, paragraph 3, of the SCTH statute, a Tourism Information and Research Centre shall be established to develop and promote tourism, and to issue tourism publications in coordination with the concerned parties. Accordingly, in 2002 the Centre was established .

Takamul 
Takamul is a program launched by the Saudi Commission for Tourism and National Heritage. The main aim of the program is to qualify Saudi professionals to manage and operate the tourism sector in Saudi Arabia. The program is mainly tailored to provide training courses that qualify as international accredited tour guides.  To date, 9,631 young Saudis have benefited from the programs.

See also 

 Tourism in Saudi Arabia
 Ancient Towns in Saudi Arabia
 Destruction of early Islamic heritage sites in Saudi Arabia

References 

Tourism
2020 establishments in Saudi Arabia
Ministries established in 2020
Saudi Arabia
Saudi Arabia
Tourism in Saudi Arabia